Chaetogastra gracilis is a species of flowering plant in the family Melastomataceae. It is native to much of South America, from Venezuela in the north to northeast Argentina in the south. It was first described in 1823 by Aimé Bonpland as Rhexia gracilis. Its synonyms include Tibouchina gracilis.

References

gracilis
Flora of South America
Plants described in 1823